The Graduate Management Admission Test (GMAT ()) is a computer adaptive test (CAT) intended to assess certain analytical, writing, quantitative, verbal, and reading skills in written English for use in admission to a graduate management program, such as a Master of Business Administration (MBA) program. Answering the test questions requires knowledge of English grammatical rules, reading comprehension, and mathematical skills such as arithmetic, algebra, and geometry. The Graduate Management Admission Council (GMAC) owns and operates the test, and states that the GMAT assesses analytical writing and problem-solving abilities while also addressing data sufficiency, logic, and critical reasoning skills that it believes to be vital to real-world business and management success. It can be taken up to five times a year but no more than eight times total. Attempts must be at least 16 days apart.

GMAT is a registered trademark of the Graduate Management Admission Council. More than 7,000 programs at approximately 2,300+ graduate business schools around the world accept the GMAT as part of the selection criteria for their programs. Business schools use the test as a criterion for admission into a wide range of graduate management programs, including MBA, Master of Accountancy, Master of Finance programs and others. The GMAT is administered online and in standardized test centers in 114 countries around the world. According to a survey conducted by Kaplan Test Prep, the GMAT is still the number one choice for MBA aspirants. According to GMAC, it has continually performed validity studies to statistically verify that the exam predicts success in business school programs. The number of test-takers of GMAT plummeted from 2012 to 2021.

History
In 1953, the organization now called the Graduate Management Admission Council (GMAC) began as an association of nine business schools, whose goal was to develop a standardized test to help business schools select qualified applicants. In the first year it was offered, the assessment (now known as the Graduate Management Admission Test), was taken just over 2,000 times; in recent years, it has been taken more than 230,000 times annually. Initially used in admissions by 54 schools, the test is now used by more than 7,000 programs at approximately 2,300 graduate business schools around the world. On June 5, 2012, GMAC introduced an integrated reasoning section to the exam that aims to measure a test taker's ability to evaluate information presented in multiple formats from multiple sources. In April of 2020, when the COVID-19 pandemic resulted in the closing of in-person testing centers around the world, GMAC quickly moved to launch an online format of the GMAT exam.

Criticism
In 2013, an independent research study evaluated student performance at three full-time MBA programs and reported that the GMAT total score had a 0.29 statistical correlation with the first-year GPA (Grade Point Average) of the MBA programs while undergraduate GPA had a 0.35 correlation, suggesting that undergraduate performance was a stronger predictor of graduate school performance than GMAT scores. The AACSB score (a combination of GMAT total score and undergraduate GPA) provided the best predictive power (0.45 correlation) for the first-year performance on MBA core courses.

In 2017, GMAC conducted a large-scale validity study involving 28 graduate business programs, and the results showed that the median correlation between the GMAT Total score and graduate GPA was 0.38, the median correlation between the GMAT IR score and graduate GPA was 0.27, and the median correlation between undergraduate GPA and graduate GPA was 0.32. The results also showed that undergraduate GPA and GMAT scores (i.e., Verbal, Quant, IR, and AWA) jointly had 0.51 correlation with graduate GPA.

Format and timing
The GMAT exam consists of four sections: an analytical writing assessment, an integrated reasoning section, a quantitative section, and a verbal section.  Total testing time is three hours and seven minutes. Test takers have 30 minutes for the analytical writing assessment and another 30 minutes to work through 12 questions, which often have multiple parts, on the integrated reasoning section and are given 62 minutes to work through 31 questions in the quantitative section and another 65 minutes to get through 36 questions in the verbal section.

The quantitative and verbal sections of the GMAT exam are both multiple-choice and are administered in the computer-adaptive format, adjusting to a test taker's level of ability. At the start of the quantitative and verbal sections, test takers are presented with a question of average difficulty. As questions are answered correctly, the computer presents the test taker with increasingly difficult questions and as questions are answered incorrectly the computer presents the test taker with questions of decreasing difficulty. This process continues until test takers complete each section, at which point the computer will have an accurate assessment of their ability level in that subject area and come up with a raw score for each section.

On July 11, 2017, the GMAC announced that from now on the order in which the different parts of the GMAT are taken can be chosen at the beginning of the exam.

Three options will be available at the test center:
 Analytical Writing Assessment, Integrated Reasoning, Quantitative, Verbal (original order)
 Verbal, Quantitative, Integrated Reasoning, Analytical Writing Assessment
 Quantitative, Verbal, Integrated Reasoning, Analytical Writing Assessment

In April 2018, the GMAC officially shortened the test by half an hour, shortening the verbal and quantitative sections from 75 minutes each to 65 and 62 minutes, respectively, and shortening some of the instruction screens.

Analytical Writing Assessment (AWA)
The AWA consists of a 30-minute writing task—analysis of an argument. It is important to be able to analyze the reasoning behind a given argument and write a critique of that argument. The essay will be given two independent ratings and these ratings are averaged together to determine the test taker's AWA score. One rating is given by a computerized reading evaluation and another is given by a person at GMAC who will read and score the essay themselves without knowing what the computerized score was. The automated essay-scoring engine is an electronic system that evaluates more than 50 structural and linguistic features, including organization of ideas, syntactic variety, and topical analysis. If the two ratings differ by more than one point, another evaluation by an expert reader is required to resolve the discrepancy and determine the final score.

The analytical writing assessment is graded on a scale of 0 (minimum) to 6 (maximum) in half-point intervals. A score of 0 indicates that the response was either nonsensical, off-topic, or completely blank.

Integrated reasoning section
Integrated Reasoning (IR) is a section introduced in June 2012 and is designed to measure a test taker's ability to evaluate data presented in multiple formats from multiple sources. The skills being tested by the integrated reasoning section were identified in a survey of 740 management faculty worldwide as important for today's incoming students. The integrated reasoning section consists of 12 questions (which often consist of multiple parts themselves) in four different formats: graphics interpretation, two-part analysis, table analysis, and multi-source reasoning. Integrated reasoning scores range from 1 to 8. Like the Analytical Writing Assessment (AWA), this section is scored separately from the quantitative and verbal section. Performance on the IR and AWA sections do not contribute to the total GMAT score.

The integrated reasoning section includes four question types: table analysis, graphics interpretation, multi-source reasoning, and two-part analysis. In the table analysis section, test takers are presented with a sortable table of information, similar to a spreadsheet, which has to be analyzed. Each question will have several statements with opposite-answer options (e.g., true/false, yes/no), and test takers click on the correct option. Graphics interpretation questions ask test takers to interpret a graph or graphical image. Each question has fill-in-the-blank statements with pull-down menus; test takers must choose the options that make the statements accurate. Multi-source reasoning questions are accompanied by two to three sources of information presented on tabbed pages. Test takers click on the tabs and examine all the relevant information, which may be a combination of text, charts, and tables to answer either traditional multiple-choice or opposite-answer (e.g., yes/no, true/false) questions. Two-part analysis questions involve two components for a solution. Possible answers are given in a table format with a column for each component and rows with possible options. Test takers have to choose one response per column.

Quantitative section
The quantitative section of the GMAT seeks to measure the ability to reason quantitatively, solve quantitative problems, interpret graphic data, and analyze and use information given in a problem. Questions require knowledge of certain algebra, geometry, and arithmetic. There are two types of quantitative questions: problem solving and data sufficiency. The use of calculators is not allowed on the quantitative section of the GMAT. Test takers must do their math work out by hand using a wet erase pen and laminated graph paper which are given to them at the testing center.  Scores range from 0 to 60, although GMAC only reports scores between 6 and 51.

Problem solving questions are designed to test the ability to reason quantitatively and to solve quantitative problems. Data sufficiency is a question type unique to the GMAT designed to measure the ability to understand and analyze a quantitative problem, recognize what information is relevant or irrelevant and determine at what point there is enough information to solve a problem or recognize the fact that there is insufficient information given to solve a particular problem.

Verbal section
The verbal section of the GMAT exam includes the following question types: reading comprehension, critical reasoning, and sentence correction. Each question type gives five answer options from which to select. Verbal scores range from 0 to 60; however, scores below 9 or above 44 are rare.

According to GMAC, the reading comprehension question type tests ability to analyze information and draw a conclusion. Reading comprehension passages can be anywhere from one to several paragraphs long. According to GMAC, the critical reasoning question type assesses reasoning skills. According to GMAC, the sentence correction question type tests grammar and effective communication skills. From the available answer options, the test taker should select the most effective construction that best expresses the intent of the sentence.

Scoring
The total GMAT score ranges from 200 to 800 and measures performance on the quantitative and verbal sections together (performance on the AWA and IR sections do not count toward the total score, those sections are scored separately). Scores are given in increments of 10 (e.g. 540, 550, 560, 570, etc.).

The score distribution conforms to a bell curve with a standard deviation of approximately 120 points, meaning that about 68% of examinees score between 430 and 670. More precisely, over the three-year period 2014–2017 the mean score was 556.04 with a standard deviation of 120.45 points. 

The final score is not based solely on the last question the examinee answers (i.e. the level of difficulty of questions reached through the computer adaptive presentation of questions). The algorithm used to build a score is more complicated than that. The examinee can make a mistake and answer incorrectly and the computer will recognize that item as an anomaly. If the examinee misses the first question, the final score will not necessarily fall in the bottom half of the range.

At the end of the exam, an unofficial preview of the GMAT score earned is shown to the test taker, who then has two minutes to decide whether to keep or cancel the score at the test center.  A test taker can also cancel a score online within the 72 hours after the scheduled exam start time.  A cancelled score can be reinstated for 4 years and 11 months after the date of the test for a fee of $50.

Use by clubs for intellectuals 
Scores at or above the 99th percentile are accepted as qualifying evidence to join Intertel, and a score of at least 746 qualifies one for admission to the International Society for Philosophical Enquiry. According to an official study conducted by the GMAC, a score of at least 760 is required to reach the 99th percentile.

Scheduling and preparing for the exam
Test takers may register for the GMAT either online at mba.com or by calling one of the test centers. To schedule an exam, an appointment must be made at one of the designated test centers. The GMAT may not be taken more than once within 16 days but no more than five times in a rolling 12-month period and no more than eight times total, even if the scores are canceled. Official GMAT exam study materials are available on the mba.com online store and through third-party vendors. The cost of the exam is $250. All applicants are required to present valid ID when taking the test. Upon completion of the test, test takers have the option of canceling or reporting their scores.  As of July 2014, test takers were allowed to view their score before making this decision.

There are test preparation companies that offer GMAT courses, private and group instruction as well as practice platforms. Certain MBA Admissions Consulting companies offer online and in-person GMAT preparation. Other available test preparation resources include university text books, GMAT preparation books and online material, sample tests, and free web resources.

Because of the COVID-19 outbreak, the GMAT was made available to take online and at home starting April 20, 2020. Top business schools, including Harvard Business School and MIT Sloan, announced that they would accept scores from the virtual exam.

See also
 Business school
 Master of Accountancy
 Master of Business Administration
 List of admissions tests

References

External links
 Graduate Management Admission Council

1953 establishments in the United States
Standardized tests
Business education
Standardized tests in the United States